Sam is a 1986 American short documentary film directed by Aaron D. Weisblatt. It focuses on Sam Phelps, a New York State farmer who is opposed to the destruction of a nearby watershed, and argues for better planning and land management. The film was nominated for an Academy Award for Best Documentary Short.

References

External links

1986 films
1986 documentary films
1986 short films
American short documentary films
American independent films
1980s short documentary films
Documentary films about environmental issues
Films shot in New York (state)
1986 independent films
1980s English-language films
1980s American films